Greatest Hits Live is a live album by the Canadian rock band April Wine, released in 1999. Also known as King Biscuit Flower Hour, but this is the label it was released under.

Track listing
All tracks written by Myles Goodwyn unless otherwise noted.
 "Anything You Want"
 "Future Tense"
 "Crash and Burn"
 "Before the Dawn" (B. Greenway)
 "Waiting on a Miracle"
 "Enough is Enough"
 "If You See Kay" (David Freeland)
 "Just Between You and Me"
 "Sign of the Gypsy Queen" (Lorence Hud)
 "21st Century Schizoid Man" (R. Fripp, M. Giles, G. Lake, I. McDonald, P. Sinfield)
 "I Like to Rock"
 "Roller"
 "Oowatanite" (J. Clench)
 "All Over Town"
 "You Could Have Been a Lady" (Errol Brown, Tony Wilson) *Bonus Track

Personnel
 Myles Goodwyn – lead & background vocals, guitars
 Brian Greenway – vocals, guitars
 Gary Moffet – guitars, background vocals
 Steve Lang – bass, background vocals
 Jerry Mercer – drums, background vocals

References

April Wine albums
1999 live albums
1999 greatest hits albums
MCA Records live albums